is a Japanese football player for Customs United in Thai League 2.

National team career
In October 2013, Sakai was elected Japan U-17 national team for 2013 U-17 World Cup. He played all 4 matches and scored a goal against Tunisia. In May 2017, he was elected Japan U-20 national team for 2017 U-20 World Cup. At this tournament, he played 2 matches as defensive midfielder.

Club statistics
Updated to 25 February 2019.

References

External links

Profile at Oita Trinita

Players Profile - Thai League

1996 births
Living people
Association football people from Nagasaki Prefecture
Japanese footballers
Japan youth international footballers
J1 League players
J2 League players
J3 League players
Daisuke Sakai
Oita Trinita players
Albirex Niigata players
Thespakusatsu Gunma players
Gainare Tottori players
Daisuke Sakai
J.League U-22 Selection players
Association football midfielders